Mae Boren Axton (September 14, 1914 – April 9, 1997) was known in the music industry as the "Queen Mother of Nashville." She co-wrote the Elvis Presley hit single "Heartbreak Hotel" with Tommy Durden. She worked with Mel Tillis, Reba McEntire, Willie Nelson, Eddy Arnold, Tanya Tucker, Johnny Tillotson, and Blake Shelton.

Personal life
Boren was born in Texas to Mark L. and Nannie Boren. The only daughter out of nine children, she was the sister of United States Congressman Lyle Boren. When Boren was two years old the family moved to Oklahoma. She attended East Central State College and the University of Oklahoma, where she earned a bachelor's degree in journalism. She obtained a public teaching certificate and taught English and journalism at schools throughout Oklahoma.

Boren married John T. Axton, an officer in the US Navy, and they had two sons: folk music singer-songwriter, guitarist, film and television actor Hoyt Axton and John, who became an attorney. The family lived in Comanche, Oklahoma during the children's pre-teen years. In 1949,  Axton  was stationed in Jacksonville, Florida and the family moved there. Boren taught English at Dupont High School, Paxon High School and Ribault High School in Jacksonville, Florida.

Music career

By the early to mid-1950s, Mae had developed a number of connections in the music industry. The best-known of these was music executive, song publisher, and songwriter Fred Rose (famous for his work with Hank Williams). She also became a songwriting partner with Jacksonville musicians Tommy Durden and Glen Reeves. During this time, Boren also worked as a radio announcer and music promoter. 

Boren is credited with writing approximately 200 songs. Artists who recorded her early compositions include Perry Como and Ernest Tubb. In 1983, Mae also discovered a young Tiffany Darwish singing country songs at the Palomino Club in Los Angeles. Mae brought the singer to Nashville, and soon afterwards Tiffany would set a record for the youngest female artist to top the Billboard charts with a debut album. Since 1998, The Academy of Country Music (ACM) has presented the Mae Boren Axton Service Award to "an outstanding country music artist, duo/group or industry leader in recognition of years of dedication and service to the Academy of Country Music." Recipients include Paul Moore, Barry Adelman, Bob Kingsley, Reba McEntire and Keith Urban.

"Heartbreak Hotel"

Boren was the link between Elvis Presley and RCA Victor. She introduced a 19-year-old Presley to Colonel Tom Parker after a performance in Jacksonville, FL. She worked on behalf of Bob Neal to promote Presley and pressured RCA Victor's Nashville division head Stephen H. Sholes to sign Presley. In 1955 Boren co-wrote the Elvis Presley hit-song "Heartbreak Hotel" with Tommy Durden. Durden presented the idea to Mae Axton from a newspaper article he had read in which criminal and painter Alvin Krolik said, "This is the story of a person who walked a lonely street." It was Boren who suggested there be a Heartbreak Hotel at the end of the man's lonely street, thus creating Elvis' first #1 record and one of the greatest rock and roll hits.

Death
In 1997 at the age of 82, Mae drowned in her hot tub at her home in Hendersonville, Tennessee, after an apparent heart attack.

References

Further reading
Axton, Mae Boren. Country Singers as I Know 'Em. Hurst: Sweet Publishing Co. (1973).

External links

Mae Boren Axton from Black Cat Rockabilly Europe
Obituary from The Independent
Oklahoma Women's Hall of Fame Oral History Project -- OSU Library

1914 births
1997 deaths
People from Ellis County, Texas
American women country singers
American country singer-songwriters
American women composers
Music promoters
20th-century American educators
Singer-songwriters from Oklahoma
Writers from Jacksonville, Florida
People from Comanche, Oklahoma
20th-century American composers
20th-century American singers
Singer-songwriters from Texas
University of Oklahoma alumni
Boren family
20th-century American women singers
Educators from Texas
20th-century American women educators
Country musicians from Texas
Country musicians from Oklahoma
Country musicians from Florida
20th-century women composers
Singer-songwriters from Florida